The Coldren Opera House is a former theater that operated in Iowa City, Iowa from 1877 until its closure in 1912.

History

The original opening of Englert Theatre with its legitimate stage and orchestra pit, plus a huge retractable screen for motion picture presentations, coupled with a new University of Iowa auditorium in Macbride Hall, which had been opened during 1908, spelled doom for another notable Iowa City institution, the Coldren Opera House (initially called the Grand Opera House) at 105 College Street.

Although calling itself an opera house, little opera was ever performed there.  Rather, the name avoided less respectable terms, such as "theater" or "drama house." From its opening during 1877 until its 1912 closing, the Coldren had served hundreds of the prominent traveling road shows and events of its era, including a lecture by Oscar Wilde in 1882, as well as a variety of university functions from presidential inaugurations to graduation ceremonies.

The Coldren interior, considered spectacular in its time, had featured an array of chandelier and sconce lighting fixtures using coal gas produced locally beginning during 1857. Its stage lighting was state-of-the-art during the late 19th century.  After the Coldren purchase and remodeling of 1897, it seated 845 on three levels within two floors of the structure.

References

Buildings and structures in Iowa City, Iowa
Theatres in Iowa
Theatres completed in 1877
1877 establishments in Iowa
1912 disestablishments in the United States